Jaba Jaba Maya Bascha is a Nepali romantic drama movie directed by Vijay Thapa and co-directed by Ashok Dhakal featuring Jiwan Luitel and Rekha Thapa in lead roles.

Cast
 Jiwan Luitel as Shrawan
 Rekha Thapa as Simran
 Shreejana Basnet as Simran's Mother
 Saroj K.C.
 Mithila Sharma
 Ganesh Upreti
 Sunil Dutta Pandey

References

 https://www.kantipurdaily.com/printedition/2011/11/22/257010.html
 https://reelnepal.com/movie/21345/jaba-jaba-maya-bascha/crew
 https://kuwaitnepal.com/2010/11/27/%E0%A4%B8%E0%A4%BF%E0%A4%95%E0%A5%8D%E0%A4%95%E0%A4%BF%E0%A4%AE-%E0%A4%AA%E0%A5%81%E0%A4%97%E0%A5%8D%E0%A4%AF%E0%A5%8B-%E0%A4%9C%E0%A4%AC-%E0%A4%9C%E0%A4%AC-%E0%A4%AE%E0%A4%BE%E0%A4%AF%E0%A4%BE/amp/ 

Nepalese romantic drama films